Opencast (formerly known as Opencast Matterhorn) is a free, open-source software for automated video capture, processing, managing, and distribution. Opencast is built by a community of developers in collaboration with leading universities and organizations worldwide.

Terminology 

Opencast is a term to describe audio and video content, primarily in an academic context. It combines the terms "Open" for Open Source and/or Open Access and "Broadcast". The term has been coined in the context of the Opencast Community and the Opencast project.

History 

The Opencast Community was initiated by the University of California, Berkeley in 2007 to coordinate academic institutions, individuals, and companies interested in the production, management, and distribution of academic video.

The Opencast software project, named Opencast Matterhorn at that time, stems from the community in that 13 institutions from North America and Europe initiated a cooperation in 2009 to build a free, open-source software to produce, manage and distribute academic audio and video content, with a focus on lecture recordings. The project received funding from the Hewlett Foundation and the Andrew W. Mellon Foundation. Opencast Matterhorn 1.0 was released in 2010.

With the end of the yearlong funding period, community and project set themselves up as an open-source initiative, driven by the various stakeholders (academic institutions, commercial partners).

Coinciding with the release of version 2.0 in the summer of 2015, "Opencast Matterhorn" was rebranded as "Opencast" to denote the end of the (Matterhorn) project and its transformation into an open source product.

A year later, Opencast joined the Apereo Foundation. The Foundation is a non-profit organization which fosters use and development of free, open-source software in higher education and serves as legal entity for a series of open-source projects.

Releases 

Opencast follows a time-based release cycle, publishing two major releases per year and several minor bugfix and maintenance releases in between. The two major releases are usually released per year, one in June and one in December, with a detailed release calendar being published usually half a year before the release.

Since version 3.0 (released on Jun 14, 2017) Opencast uses a major.minor version schema, indicating the major release and the bugfix level. Versions are actively maintained for one year–the latest two major releases–though specific versions may get long-term support from the community.

References

External links 
 
 Official documentation
 Official code repository



Free software
Free software programmed in Java (programming language)
Educational technology projects
Free educational software
Free video software